Sir Clifford Sifton,  (March 10, 1861 – April 17, 1929), was a Canadian lawyer and a long-time Liberal politician, best known for being Minister of the Interior under Sir Wilfrid Laurier. He was responsible for encouraging the massive amount of immigration to Canada which occurred during the first decade of the 20th century. In 1905, he broke with Laurier and resigned from cabinet over the issue of publicly funded religious education in the new provinces of Alberta and Saskatchewan.

Early life
Sifton was born in Middlesex County, Canada West (now Ontario). Sifton's father, John Wright Sifton, was a contractor and businessman who moved with his family to Manitoba when Sifton was a boy.

Sifton trained as a lawyer and graduated from Victoria University in the University of Toronto, where he was the founding manager of Acta Victoriana.

Political career

Manitoba provincial politics: Attorney General for Manitoba 
Sifton worked on his father's political campaigns before being himself elected to the legislative assembly of Manitoba in 1888. Sifton served in the cabinet of Thomas Greenway from 1891 to 1896 as attorney general and Provincial Lands Commissioner. He played a role in negotiating the Laurier-Greenway Compromise, which temporarily resolved the Manitoba Schools Question.

Federal politics: Minister of the Interior 
In 1896, Sifton was first elected a Member of Parliament after being acclaimed in a by-election in Brandon. He was re-elected in the 1900 Canadian federal election against a strong challenge from former Manitoba premier Hugh John Macdonald. Sifton would be re-elected two more times, in 1904 and 1908.

Sifton was appointed Minister of the Interior under Laurier and implemented a vigorous immigration policy to encourage people to settle and populate the West. Sifton established colonial offices in Europe and the United States. He enticed people to come to western Canada. While many of the immigrants came from Britain and the United States, there was also, to Canada, a large influx of Ukrainians, Scandinavians, Doukhobors, and other groups from the Austro-Hungarian Empire. He famously defended the "stalwart peasants in sheep-skin coats" who were turning some of the most difficult parts of the western plains into productive farms.

Between 1891 and 1914, more than three million people came to Canada, largely from continental Europe, following the path of the newly constructed transcontinental railway. In the same period, mining industries were begun in the Klondike and the Canadian Shield.

After presiding over the creation of Alberta and Saskatchewan in 1905, Sifton resigned from cabinet following a dispute with Laurier over religious education.

Especially later in his life, Sifton battled increasing deafness, which precluded any further potential political advances.

Later life
Sifton retired from politics in 1911 but crusaded against the government policy of reciprocity, because he believed that increased economic integration between Canada and the United States would result in Canada being taken over by the Americans.

A sometimes repeated assertion on immigration policy, that "a stalwart peasant in a sheep-skin coat, born on the soil,[...]is good quality," was made in a 1922 article he wrote.

Sifton died in 1929 in New York City, where he had been visiting a heart specialist. He left a fortune estimated at $3.2 million, equivalent to about $ in present-day terminology. Sifton is buried at Mount Pleasant Cemetery, Toronto.

Family

Sifton, then a young lawyer, was married in Winnipeg, Manitoba, on August 18, 1884, to Elizabeth Armanella Burrows. She was the daughter of Henry James Burrows and his wife, Sarah Sparks. Elizabeth was born in Ottawa, Ontario, and educated at the Ottawa Ladies' College. The couple had five sons. She founded and presided over the Woman's Christian Temperance Union (WCTU) in Brandon, Manitoba.

His brother-in-law Theodore Arthur Burrows would also serve as a Liberal MP in the Laurier government, and he was later appointed the tenth Lieutenant Governor of Manitoba.

His brother Arthur Sifton served as the second Premier of Alberta.

Archives 
There is a Clifford Sifton fonds at Library and Archives Canada.

References

Further reading
 Dafoe, John W. Clifford Sifton in Relation to His Times (1931).
 Hall, D.J. "Clifford Sifton: Immigration and Settlement Policy, 1896–1905," in Howard Palmer, ed. The Settlement of the West (1977) pp. 60–85.
 
 
 
 Timlin, Mabel F. "Canada's Immigration Policy, 1896–1910," Canadian Journal of Economics and Political Science Vol. 26, No. 4 (Nov., 1960), pp. 517–532 in JSTOR.

External links

 
 
 

1861 births
1929 deaths
Canadian Knights Commander of the Order of St Michael and St George
Canadian people of Anglo-Irish descent
Liberal Party of Canada MPs
Lawyers in Manitoba
University of Toronto alumni
Members of the House of Commons of Canada from Manitoba
Members of the King's Privy Council for Canada
People from Middlesex County, Ontario
Persons of National Historic Significance (Canada)
Members of the Executive Council of Manitoba